Orthostixinae is a subfamily of the moth family Geometridae. It was described by Edward Meyrick in 1892.

Genera
 Centronaxa Prout, 1910
 Naxa Walker, 1856
 Orthostixis Hübner, 1823

References

External links

 
Geometridae
Moth subfamilies